Harry Ornest (June 30, 1923 – July 21, 1998) was a sports entrepreneur who once owned the St. Louis Blues of the National Hockey League (NHL) and the Toronto Argonauts of the Canadian Football League (CFL). He also played minor league baseball, was a linesman in the NHL, and a referee in the American Hockey League.

Biography
Ornest was born in Edmonton, Canada, the son of immigrants from Eastern Europe. He is of Jewish descent. He made his fortune in vending machines. In 1978 he founded the minor league baseball franchise, the Vancouver Canadians, which played in the Pacific Coast League. He purchased a majority of the assets of Sick's Stadium in Seattle for $60,000 to use in the new team's ballpark, Nat Bailey Stadium. Ornest was the owner of the St. Louis Blues from 1983 to 1986. Ornest proved to be the savior for a city that was on the verge of losing their team. Although the Blues maintained consistency in making the Stanley Cup playoffs since 1980, financial troubles had racked the team. At the time, it was owned by Ralston Purina, a pet food giant based in the city. They lost nearly $2 million a year for six straight years before Ralston wanted to re-focus their attention back to profits. The only thing that would stand between them moving to Saskatoon, Saskatchewan ended up being the Board of Governors, who rejected an attempt to move the gutted team (which fired 60% of their staff) there. Ralston and the NHL soon sued each other and each came up with ultimatums involving dissolving the assets of the team. August 6 was the deadline before the NHL would have held a dispersal draft. Days before the deadline, Ornest and a group of city-based investors made a bid for the team, and on July 27, the league approved the bid. He would run the team with a shoestring budget while utilizing deferred salaries to meet costs, which included having less players on contract than other teams and trading players when dealing with salary pinching; Mike Liut was the most notable case of this, as he was traded in the middle of the 1984-85 season to the Hartford Whalers despite the Blues leading the division. When he owned the Blues, Ornest changed their arena's name from the Checkerdome back to the St. Louis Arena. In his three years of ownership, the team went 106-106-28 while reaching the postseason thrice, which included making the Campbell Conference Finals in 1986, which they would not do again until 2001.

In 1986, he sold the team to Missouri native Mike Shanahan while selling the Arena to the city of St. Louis (mayor Vincent C. Schoemehl had approached Shanahan about becoming an owner).

He owned the Toronto Argonauts from 1988 to 1991.

References

External links
Baseball Reference
Los Angeles Times: obituary
So Cal Jewish Sports Hall of Fame

1923 births
1998 deaths
20th-century American businesspeople
Businesspeople from Edmonton
National Hockey League executives
St. Louis Blues owners
Toronto Argonauts owners
Canadian emigrants to the United States